Louise Mahoney is a camogie player, winner of a Soaring Star award in 2009.

Awards
She was player of the match when Harps won their third successive All Ireland junior club championship in 2008. She was UCD camogie player of the year for 2004. She and sisters Áine and Elaine were leading figures on the Harps team which won three successive All Ireland junior club championships in 2006, 2007 and 2008.

References

Living people
Year of birth missing (living people)
Laois camogie players
UCD camogie players